Aaina  is a Bollywood film. It was released in 1944.

Cast
The cast of the film:
 Trilok Kapoor
 Kaushalya
 Yakub
 Husn Banu
 Sulochana Chatterjee
 Rajkumari Shukla
 Yashodhara Katju

References

External links
 

1944 films
1940s Hindi-language films
Indian black-and-white films